Events from the year 1764 in art.

Events
February - Joshua Reynolds co-founds The Club with writer Samuel Johnson.
Johann Joachim Winckelmann's Geschichte der Kunst des Alterthums ("History of Ancient Art") is published.

Paintings

Nicola Bertucci and Carlo Lodi – The Pleasures of Country Life (tempera paintings for Villa Sampiera, Bologna)
Vigilius Eriksen – Catherine II Before the Mirror
Joshua Reynolds – Miss Nelly O'Brien
Charles-Amédée-Philippe van Loo – The Magic Lantern

Births
April 1 - Barbara Krafft, Austrian portrait painter (died 1825)
April 13 – Giacomo Guardi, Italian veduta painter (died 1835)
April 14 – Firmin Didot, French printer, engraver, and type founder (died 1836)
April 20 – Rudolph Ackermann, Saxon-born printer and lithographer (died 1834)
April 30 – Luigi Ademollo, Italian painter (died 1849)
May 11 – Grigory Ugryumov, Russian painter (died 1823)
May 20 – Johann Gottfried Schadow, German sculptor (died 1850)
July 9 – Louis-Pierre Baltard, architect and engraver (died 1846)
July 12 – Charles Thévenin, neoclassical French painter, known for heroic scenes (died 1838)
August 22 – Charles Percier, French architect and designer (died 1838)
September 18 – Mauro Gandolfi,  Italian painter and engraver of the Bolognese School (died 1834)
October 14 – Ferdinand Runk, German-Austrian landscape painter, draftsman and etcher (died 1834)
October 19 - Johann Christoph Rincklake, German portrait painter (died 1813)
Unknown
Jacques-Louis Copia, French engraver (died 1799)
Giovanni Folo, Italian engraver of the Neoclassic period (died 1836)
Probable
Qian Du, Chinese landscape painter during the Qing Dynasty (died 1844)

Deaths
March 13 – Okumura Masanobu, Japanese print designer, book publisher, and painter (born 1686)
April 9 – Marco Benefial, Italian, proto-Neoclassical painter, mainly active in Rome (born 1684)
May 3 – Francesco Algarotti, Italian philosopher, engraver and art critic (born 1712)
July 20 – Peter van Bleeck, portrait painter and engraver (born 1697)
August 23 – Johanna Marie Fosie, Danish painter and first professional native female artist in Denmark (born 1726)
September 1 – Sebastiano Conca, Italian painter (born 1680)
October 26 – William Hogarth, English painter credited with pioneering western sequential art (born 1697)
November 13 – John Wootton, English painter of sporting subjects, battle scenes and landscapes (born 1682)
Undated – Francesco Zucchi, Italian engraver (born 1692)

 
Years of the 18th century in art
1760s in art